I Know Who You Are is a 2000 Spanish-Argentine psychological thriller drama film directed by  which stars Ana Fernández and Miguel Ángel Solá along with Roberto Enríquez, Ingrid Rubio, and Manuel Manquiña.

Plot 
Just settled in Galicia, psychiatric doctor Paloma kindles with Mario, a charming patient who has developed a Korsakoff syndrome in the wake of substance abuse and some moot traumatic event occurred towards 1977 (a key year of the Spanish Transition), being unable to remember anything from that point on. She goes to great lengths to unlock Mario's repressed memories, and protect him from people chasing him. Mario is revealed to be a mercenary and hired executioner, involved in a terrorist attack against military officers investigating the army's anti-democratic pustchist plots from the inside.

Cast

Production 
A Spanish-Argentine co-production, the film was produced by Continental Producciones, Tornasol Films, and Zarlek Producciones.

Release 
The film screened in the 'Panorama' section of the 50th Berlin International Film Festival in February 2000. It was theatrically released in Spain on 7 April 2000.

Reception 
Ángel Fernández-Santos of El País assessed that Ferreira takes the reins of that "good script" with strength and clarity, "multiplying it" by virtue of her "remarkable filmmaking craft and instincts" and her "exquisite understanding with the actors", who nail their performances.

Derek Elley of Variety deemed Ferreira's "inauspicious feature debut" to be "a wannabe psychological thriller that just gets sillier as it progresses".

The review in La Nación gave the film a so-so rating, considering that, while "being neither a bad film nor an artistic nonsense" and offering a handful of good scenes, technical values, and Ana Fernández's acting solvency notwithstanding, the film is dragged by its slips, inaccuracies and certain unplausible denouements.

Accolades 

|-
| rowspan = "3" align = "center" | 2001 || rowspan = "3" | 15th Goya Awards || Best New Director || Patricia Ferreira ||  || rowspan = "3" | 
|-
| Best Actor || Miguel Ángel Solá || 
|-
| Best Original Score || José Nieto || 
|}

See also 
 List of Spanish films of 2000
 List of Argentine films of 2003

References 

2000 psychological thriller films
2000 drama films
Spanish psychological thriller films
Spanish thriller drama films
Argentine thriller drama films
Argentine psychological thriller films
Films set in Galicia (Spain)
2000s Spanish-language films
2000s Spanish films
2000s Argentine films
Tornasol Films films
Films about amnesia
Films about the Spanish Transition